Jasper is an Indian actor, who has appeared in character roles, primarily with negative shades. Jasper was a software engineer before he stepped into movies, making his debut in the Sarath Kumar-starrer Gambeeram in 2003. Jasper has done close to 200 films in a career spanning more than fifteen years, he has acted in Tamil, Telugu, Malayalam, Kannada, Hindi and a few other languages.

Career
Jasper was a software engineer before choosing to opt for a career in films. He made his acting debut in Gambeeram (2003) and appeared alongside actor Sarathkumar, who later also recommended him to feature in his next films Chatrapathy and Jithan (2004). He continued portraying supporting antagonistic roles throughout the late 2000s and won acclaim for his role as a gang member in Naanayam (2011), with a critic reporting he "gets noted".

Jasper portrayed one of Sathyaraj's henchmen in the Hindi film, Chennai Express (2013), featuring alongside Shah Rukh Khan and Deepika Padukone. He was also present in a character role in Chimbu Deven's multi-starrer Puli (2015) and Siva's Vedalam (2015).

Filmography

References

1972 births
Living people
21st-century Indian male actors
Male actors in Tamil cinema
Indian male film actors